Daniele Colli (born April 19, 1982) is an Italian former professional road racing cyclist, who rode professionally between 2005 and 2017.

On 14 May 2015, during the Stage 6 of the Giro d'Italia, Colli broke his arm following a collision with spectator.

Major results

1999
 1st  Road race, National Junior Road Championships
2000
 8th Time trial, UCI Junior Road World Championships
2003
 10th Trofeo Banca Popolare di Vicenza
2004
 1st Gran Premio della Liberazione
 1st Trofeo Alcide Degasperi
 2nd Coppa Citta' di Asti
 5th Coppa della Pace
 7th Trofeo Franco Balestra
2006
 2nd Down Under Classic
 8th Gran Premio della Costa Etruschi
2008
 6th Overall Tour of Szeklerland
1st Stage 3
2009
 3rd Memorial Cimurri
 5th Giro del Mendrisiotto
 5th Giro della Romagna
 6th Overall Tour of Hainan
 6th Neuseen Classics
 6th Gran Premio Città di Camaiore
 7th Polynormande
 8th Trophée des Grimpeurs
 8th GP Kranj
2010
 3rd Gran Premio Industria e Commercio Artigianato Carnaghese
 4th Classica Sarda
 4th Rund um Köln
 4th Coppa Bernocchi
 4th GP Nobili Rubinetterie – Coppa Città di Stresa
 5th Grand Prix Pino Cerami
 5th Ronde van Drenthe
 5th Grand Prix de Denain
 8th Memorial Rik Van Steenbergen
 10th Overall Circuit de Lorraine
 10th Gran Premio Città di Camaiore
2011
 7th Gran Premio Industria e Commercio di Prato
 8th Overall Danmark Rundt
 8th GP Nobili Rubinetterie – Coppa Città di Stresa
 8th Paris–Brussels
 10th Gran Premio Industria e Commercio Artigianato Carnaghese
2012
 1st Stage 8 Tour of Austria
 2nd Overall Giro della Provincia di Reggio Calabria
 3rd Dwars door Drenthe
 4th Philadelphia International Cycling Classic
 7th Rogaland GP
2013
 5th Coppa Bernocchi
2014
 3rd Grand Prix Pino Cerami
 4th Volta Limburg Classic
2015
 1st Overall Tour of China I
1st Stage 4
 2nd Overall Tour de Hokkaido
1st Points classification
1st Stage 2
 5th Kuurne–Brussels–Kuurne
2016
 1st Points classification Tour of Qinghai Lake

References

External links

Daniele Colli profile at Geox-TMC

1982 births
Living people
Italian male cyclists
People from Rho, Lombardy
Cyclists from the Metropolitan City of Milan